Angiostoma schizoglossae is a species of parasitic nematodes.

This species was described from the gastropod Schizoglossa novoseelandica from New Zealand in 1995.

References 

Angiostomatidae
Nematodes described in 1995